Rubus amplior is an uncommon species of brambles in the rose family. It has been found only in Guatemala.

Rubus amplior is a reclining perennial with purple stems and many curved prickles. Leaves are compound with 3 or 5 leaflets, a few hairs on the upper side but dense hairs underneath. Flowers are white. Fruits are dark purple.

References

amplior
Flora of Guatemala
Plants described in 1913